Eddie Pagan (August 1, 1918August 1, 1984) was an American stock car racing driver. Pagan was born in Midland, Texas on August 1, 1918. According to an entry in the 1940 U.S. Census, Pagan was living in New Mexico with his wife Marian by the year 1940. Pagan also lived a significant portion of his adult life in Lynwood, California. He competed in 54 NASCAR Grand National West Series races from 1954 to 1957. Pagan had 9 West Series wins, 41 top tens, and 11 pole positions.

Pagan competed in 62 NASCAR Grand National Series races between 1954 and 1963. During his time at NASCAR's highest level, he won 4 races, achieved 38 top tens, and 6 pole positions.

During the 1958 Darlington Southern 500, he had a massive crash. The crash has since became knows as the Eddie Pagan Flip.

In 1971, he co-founded Hutcherson-Pagan Enterprises with Dick Hutcherson, a company that built race cars for drivers such as Darrell Waltrip and A. J. Foyt.

Pagan died August 1, 1984, in Harrisburg, North Carolina.

References

External links
 
 

1918 births
1984 deaths
NASCAR drivers
Racing drivers from California
People from Lynwood, California